Cristian Martín Rodríguez Telis (born 10 February 1985 in Artigas, Uruguay), is an Uruguayan footballer who plays as a defender for Villa Teresa.

External links
 Profile at Tenfield 
 Martín Rodríguez – Argentine Primera statistics at Fútbol XXI 

Uruguayan footballers
1985 births
Living people
People from Artigas Department
Uruguay international footballers
Argentine Primera División players
Uruguayan Segunda División players
Venezuelan Primera División players
Club Atlético River Plate (Montevideo) players
Club Nacional de Football players
Liverpool F.C. (Montevideo) players
Club Atlético Banfield footballers
Hebei F.C. players
Tacuarembó F.C. players
Villa Española players
Zulia F.C. players
Villa Teresa players
Expatriate footballers in Argentina
Expatriate footballers in China
Uruguayan expatriate sportspeople in China
Association football defenders
Uruguayan expatriate sportspeople in Argentina